(George) Leighton Seager, 1st Baron Leighton of St Mellons CBE (11 January 1896 – 17 October 1963), known as Sir George Leighton Seager, 1st Baronet, from 1952 to 1962, was a Welsh shipping magnate.

Leighton of St Mellons was the son of Sir William Henry Seager, of Cardiff, the founder of W. H. Seager & Company, shipowners. He was a director of the family firm and also served as President of the Cardiff Chamber of Commerce from 1934 to 1945 and of the Council of Shipping in 1944. Apart from his business career he also held the posts of High Sheriff of Monmouthshire for 1938 and Vice-Lieutenant of Monmouthshire from 1957 to 1963. He was knighted in 1938, created a Baronet, of St Mellons in the County of Monmouth on 1 July 1952 and raised to the peerage as Baron Leighton of St Mellons, of St Mellons in the County of Monmouth, on 25 January 1962.

Lord Leighton of St Mellons married Marjorie, daughter of William Henry Gimson, in 1921. He died in October 1963, aged 67, and was succeeded in his titles by his son John. Lady Leighton of St Mellons died in May 1992, aged 92.

References

Kidd, Charles, Williamson, David (editors). Debrett's Peerage and Baronetage (1990 edition). New York: St Martin's Press, 1990, 

Short history of Seager family

1896 births
1963 deaths
Commanders of the Order of the British Empire
People educated at Queen's College, Taunton
People from Glamorgan
Welsh businesspeople in shipping
High Sheriffs of Monmouthshire
Businesspeople from Cardiff
Hereditary barons created by Elizabeth II
20th-century Welsh businesspeople